Bocquillonia longipes is a species of plant in the family Euphorbiaceae. It is endemic to New Caledonia.

References

longipes
Endemic flora of New Caledonia
Vulnerable plants
Taxonomy articles created by Polbot